The Tachikaze-class destroyer was a second generation guided missile destroyer class, formerly in service with the Japan Maritime Self-Defense Force (JMSDF). The ships of this class have had successive improvements after their completion, especially to their C4I systems.

The Tachikaze class was equipped with the Tartar-D system as the key weapon system, the fleet-area air defense weapon system with the Standard-1 MR missile. At the same time, this was the American first native integrated weapon system with the Naval Tactical Data System (NTDS), so this class was the first of the Maritime Self Defense Force's ships that utilised computers widely. As the NTDS, OYQ-1 Weapon Entry System (WES) was on board on  the lead ship, Tachikaze. On the second ship, Asakaze, the improved OYQ-2 Target Designation System (TDS) was on board. And the third ship, Sawakaze, introduced the new-generation combat direction system, OYQ-4. 

The Tachikaze-class destroyers' weapon systems include one Mk 13 missile launcher for the Standard-1 MR surface-to-air missile, one Type 74 octuple launcher (Japanese version of the American Mark 16 GMLS) for the ASROC anti-submarine rockets, eight Boeing Harpoon anti-ship missile, two 20-mm Phalanx CIWS gun mounts, two Type 68 (Model HOS-301) triple  torpedo tubes, and two 5-inch/54 caliber Mark 42 rapid-fire guns.

In 1998, Tachikaze was converted to be the flagship of the Fleet Escort Force. The aft 5-inch gun was replaced with a fleet command area.  Tachikaze was decommissioned in 2007. Sawakaze then succeeded her in the flagship role.

The ships of the Tachikaze class were decommissioned beginning in 2007.

All three vessels of the Tachikaze class were named after destroyers of the Imperial Japanese Navy, with Tachikaze and Asakaze being lost to enemy action during the war.

Ships in the class

References

External links

GlobalSecurity.org; JMSDF DDG Tachikaze Class

 
Destroyer classes